The 2006 European Men's and Women's Team Badminton Championships was held in Alexandreio Melathron in Thessaloniki, Greece, from February 14 to February 19, 2006. This tournament also serves as European qualification for the 2006 Thomas & Uber Cup.

Medalists

Men's team

Final stage

Final

Women's team

Final stage

Final

References

External links
2006 European Men's and Women's Team Badminton Championships - Tournament Software

European Men's and Women's Team Badminton Championships
European Men's and Women's Team Badminton Championships
Badminton tournaments in Greece
2006 in Greek sport